Hans Boeckh-Behrens (27 November 1898 – 13 February 1955) was a German general during World War II. He was a recipient of the Knight's Cross of the Iron Cross. Boeckh-Behrens surrendered to Soviet forces in May 1945 and died in captivity on 13 February 1955.

Awards and decorations

 German Cross in Gold on 30 January 1943 as Oberst im Generalstab in the AOK 16
 Knight's Cross of the Iron Cross on 9 December 1944 as Generalleutnant and commander of 32. Infanterie-Division

References

Citations

Bibliography

1898 births
1955 deaths
German people who died in Soviet detention
German prisoners of war in World War II held by the Soviet Union
Lieutenant generals of the German Army (Wehrmacht)
Recipients of the clasp to the Iron Cross, 1st class
Recipients of the Gold German Cross
Recipients of the Knight's Cross of the Iron Cross
Military personnel from Saxony-Anhalt